Oberanven is a small town in the commune of Niederanven, in central Luxembourg.  , the town has a population of 627.  It is the administrative centre of the commune of Niederanven: new headquarters having been built in the town in 2005.

It is a very wealthy village with many mansions.

Footnotes

Niederanven
Towns in Luxembourg

And the family of Pau lives there!